Peter Lyons Collister, A.S.C. (born March 9, 1956) is an American cinematographer and second unit director, known for his collaborations with directors Mike Mitchell, Tim Hill and Walt Becker.

He was born in Cleveland, Ohio. Currently a member of the American Society of Cinematographers, he has worked on over thirty films in his career.

In her 2019 memoir Inside Out, Demi Moore confessed to an affair with Collister in 1983 while she was married to her first husband.

Filmography

References

External links 
 

1956 births
American cinematographers
Living people
Artists from Cleveland